Ballyhea GAA is a hurling club in the village of Ballyhea in Cork, Ireland. The club is affiliated to the Avondhu, division of Cork GAA. As of 2015, the club was competing in the Cork Senior Hurling Championship. It does not field Gaelic football teams.

History

Ballyhea GAA Club has been in existence for over 126 years. The history of the club published in 1984 say the first GAA meeting took place in Jim Powers's Forge in the townland of Pruntas in late 1885 or early 1886. During its history the club has won County Championships in Senior, Intermediate, Junior and Juvenile Hurling.

Over the years, Ballyhea players have helped Avondhu to County success. 1952 saw Lack Morrissey play in goal, Mick Quinn was corner-back, Jim Walshe was full-forward. 1966 saw Billy Fitzgibbon, Jack Russell, and Pat Behan win Senior County medals. All-Ireland medals have come to the parish from most grades, Vocational Schools Colleges, Minor, Under-21 and the two Senior, Johnny O'Callaghan in 1986 and Neil Ronan in 1999 and 2005.. The club has also produced a number of Inter County Referees like John Sexton and Dave Copps for hurling while Ciarán O' Regan, a new younger referee is on the Munster panel and also the National Support Panel. Mike O' Kelly also represented the club as a referee in Camogie. Mike ref'd 4 All Ireland Finals in 2010 (Club, League, Minor and Championship)

The club's website, ballyheagaa.com, was named best website at the McNamee Awards in 2010. These awards are presented annually for contributions in the area of media and communications. The award was presented by GAA President Criostóir Ó Cuana, at a function in Croke Park on 24 July 2010.

Roll of honour

Cork Senior Hurling Championship (1): 1896 (Runners-Up 1895, 1984, 1995)
Cork Premier Intermediate Hurling Championship (1): 2014
Cork Intermediate Hurling Championship (2): 1931, 1944, 1980 (Runners-Up 1977)
Cork Junior A Hurling Championship (3): 1930, 1955, 1976 (Runners-Up 1959)
Cork Junior B Hurling Championship (1): 2022
Cork Minor A Hurling Championship (1): 2001 (Runners-Up 2012)
Cork Minor C Hurling Championship (1): 2011
North Cork Junior A Hurling Championship (10): 1930, 1949, 1950, 1953, 1955, 1958, 1959, 1965, 1975, 1976  
Cork Junior B Inter-Divisional Hurling Championship (1): 2022
North Cork Junior "B" Hurling Championship (5): 1944, 1948, 2002, 2007, 2011, 2022

Notable players

 Paddy Behan
 Johnny O'Callaghan
 Darren Ronan
 Neil Ronan

References

External sources
 Official Ballyhea GAA website
 Cork GAA Results
 Official McNamee Press Release

Gaelic games clubs in County Cork
Hurling clubs in County Cork
1884 establishments in Ireland